Murichaq,,, is a village in Murghab District, Badghis Province in north western Afghanistan.

Murichaq is on the border with Turkmenistan and is a border crossing point.

References

External links
Satellite map at Maplandia.com

Populated places in Badghis Province
Afghanistan–Turkmenistan border crossings